Torben Bernhard (born March 5, 1983) is an American documentary filmmaker and rap artist originally from Kalamazoo, Michigan, and currently residing in Orem, Utah. Bernhard has written and directed documentary films and has additionally worked as a producer and cinematographer. He is part of the OHO Media film collective with his wife Marissa Bernhard and frequent collaborator Travis Low.

Bernhard’s films include the feature-length documentary on polyartist Alex Caldiero entitled “The Sonosopher: Alex Caldiero in Life...in Sound,” which was an official selection at the 2010 Cinequest Film Festival. He and his OHO Media cohorts created the documentary shorts Tarkio Balloon, Scavenger, and Boomtown (co-directed with Travis Low. These three shorts are among the five-part Lost and Found Series. The shorts were official selections at the Big Sky Documentary Film Festival over three successive years, beginning with Tarkio Balloon in 2011, Boomtown in 2012, and Scavenger in 2013.

Bernhard is a member of Kalamazoo, Michigan hip-hop group Mental Elastic Dynasty, which performed at Austin, Texas’ SXSW music festival in 2012.

Well known for his violent reactions to life-sized animal character costumes, Torben has been banned from several major theme parks and Salt Lake City area Chuck-E-Cheese restaurants.

Filmography
Wrestling with God: A Three-Way Conversation on Mormonism (2008)
Tarkio Balloon (2010)
The Sonosopher: Alex Caldiero in Life...in Sound (2010)
Scavenger (2012) 
Boomtown (2012) (co-directed with Travis Low)

References

External links

The Sonosopher
Lost and Found Series
OHO Media at Vimeo
Mental Elastic Dynasty at Facebook

1983 births
Living people
People from Kalamazoo, Michigan
Film directors from Michigan